World Trade Centers are sites recognized by the World Trade Centers Association.

World Trade Center may refer to:

Buildings
 List of World Trade Centers
 World Trade Center (2001–present), a building complex that includes five skyscrapers, a museum, and a memorial
One World Trade Center, the signature building of the rebuilt complex
 World Trade Center (1973–2001), a building complex that was destroyed during the September 11 attacks in 2001.
 World Trade Center site, also known as "Ground Zero"
 Taipei World Trade Center

Other uses
 World Trade Center (film), a 2006 film
 World Trade Center station (IND Eighth Avenue Line), a New York City Subway terminal station, serving the 
 World Trade Center station (MBTA), a Massachusetts Bay Transportation Authority station in Boston
 World Trade Center station (PATH), a Port Authority Trans-Hudson station in New York City
 WTC Cortlandt station (also known as "World Trade Center"), a New York City Subway station, serving the 
Taipei 101–World Trade Center metro station, a metro station in Taipei, Taiwan
WTC NYPD Breast Bar used by NYPD Officers that were in active service during the September 11 attacks

See also
 World Financial Center (disambiguation)
 World Trade (disambiguation)
 :Category:World Trade Centers

Buildings and structures disambiguation pages